is a Japanese whisky distillery.

References

Notes

Bibliography

Distilleries in Japan
Japanese whisky
Companies based in Nagano Prefecture
1985 establishments in Japan
Japanese brands